is a city located in Hyōgo Prefecture in the Kansai region of Japan. , the city had an estimated population of 525,682 in 227,099 households and a population density of 980 persons per km².

Geography
Himeji is located in the central western part of the Harima Plain in the western part of Hyogo Prefecture, and is the central city of the Harima region of the prefecture. The Ichikawa River is located in the central eastern part of the city, and the Senba River and Noda River are located in the center. The Ieshima Islands in the Seto Inland Sea are within the city limits and are located off the coast of Harima Bay.
The city is surrounded by the mountains and the sea.

Neighbouring municipalities 
Hyōgo Prefecture
 Kakogawa
 Takasago
 Kasai
 Tatsuno
 Shisō
 Taishi
 Kamikawa
 Ichikawa

Climate
Himeji has a humid subtropical climate (Köppen climate classification Cfa) with hot summers and cool winters. Summers are significantly wetter than winters.

Demographics
Per Japanese census data, the population of Himeji in 2020 is 530,495 people. Himeji has been conducting censuses since 1920.

History 
Himeji has been the center of Harima Province since the Nara period, and was the location of the provincial capital and Harima Kokubun-ji.  After the Battle of Sekigahara, Ikeda Terumasa received a fief at Harima Province and established the Himeji Domain. He expanded Himeji Castle and its castle town.  Due to its  location dominating the San'yōdō highway connecting the Kinai region with western Japan, Himeji was a major stronghold of the Tokugawa shogunate through the Bakumatsu period. Following the Meiji restoration, Himeji was the capital of "Himeji Prefecture" (later Shikama Prefecture) from 1871, which was merged into Hyōgo Prefecture in 1876. The city of Himeji was established on April 1, 1889 with the creation of the modern municipalities system. After the 1923 Great Kantō earthquake, the Japanese government reportedly considered moving the nation's capital from Tokyo to Himeji. On April 1, 1996, Himeji attained Core city status, with increased local autonomy.

On March 27, 2006, the town of Yasutomi (from Shisō District), the town of Kōdera (from Kanzaki District), and the towns of Ieshima and Yumesaki (both from Shikama District) were merged into Himeji.

Air raids
During World War II, Himeji was a target for the United States' XXI Bomber Command as it was an important rail terminal and contained two large military zones. The first air raid occurred o June 22, 1945 at 0950, in which 60 B-29 Superfortress bombers centered on Andrea containing a Kawanishi Aircraft Company factory. The bombing killed 341 people and rendered 10,220 homeless. The second attack occurred on July 3, 1945 at 16:23, inshicn 107 aircraft dropped 767 tons of incendiary bombs Himeji, destroying 63.3% of the built up areas of the city. However, the famous Himeji Castle, although blackened by smoke from the burning city, remained unscathed, even with one firebomb being dropped on it. This attack killed 173 people, severely wounded 160, and resulted in the destruction of 10,300 buildings, rendering 45,182 people homeless.

Government
Himeji has a mayor-council form of government with a directly elected mayor and a unicameral city council of 46 members. Himeji contributes eight members to the Hyogo Prefectural Assembly. In terms of national politics, the city is divided between the Hyōgo 11th and Hyōgo 12th districts of the lower house of the Diet of Japan.

Mayors of Himeji City (1889–Present)

Economy
Himeji is located within the Hanshin Industrial Area and Harima Seaside Industrial Areas. The coastal region is heavily industrialized, with steel mills, chemical plants, semiconductor and automobile electronics predominating. In addition, Kansai Electric Power's Himeji No. 1 Power Station and Himeji No. 2 Power Station are located in the area. The northern two-thirds of the city is mainly agricultural and commercial fishing off the southern seacoast also plays a role in the economy. Traditional crafts include the production of butsudan (Buddhist altars), leather crafts, glue, matchmaking and candles.

Education

Colleges and universities
University of Hyogo - Himeji Institute of Technology
Himeji University
Himeji Dokkyo University
Himeji Hinomoto College
Kenmei Women's Junior College (1951-2008)

Primary and secondary schools
Himeji has 66 public elementary schools, 32 public middle schools and three public high schools operated by the city government and 13 public high schools operated by the Hyōgo Prefectural Department of Education. There are also four private combined middle/high schools. There are also four special education school for the handicapped, one operated by the city and three by the prefecture.

A North Korean school, can also be found in the city.

Transportation

Railway 
 JR West – San'yō Shinkansen
 
 JR West – San'yō Main Line (JR Kobe Line)
  -  -  -  ---  -   - 
 JR West – Bantan Line)
  -  -  -  -  -  - 
 JR West – Kishin Line)
  -  -  - 
 Sanyo Electric Railway - Main Line
  -  -  -  -  -  -  -  - 
 Sanyo Electric Railway - Aboshi Line
  -  -  -  -  -  -

Highways 
  San'yō Expressway
  Chūgoku Expressway
  Bantan Renraku Road

Ferries
 Shodoshima Ferry: Himeji Kazuma Port-Fukuda Port (Shōdoshima) 
 Bozeki Kisen: Himeji Kazuma Port - Tanga Island - Boze Island
 Kosoku Ieshima: Himeji Kazuma Port - Iejima
 Takafuku Liner: Himeji Kazuma Port - Iejima

International relations

Himeji is twinned or has sister city relationships with six international cities and two Japanese cities, as well as a sister castle located in France. Himeji has a particularly strong relationship with Phoenix, as teachers from America are able to teach English abroad for 1–2 years. Additionally, the Youth Ambassador Exchange Program allows for both Japanese and American high school students to experience the cultures and languages of their respective countries for 3 weeks.

Twin towns – Sister cities

International
 Charleroi, Belgium
 Phoenix, Arizona, United States
 Adelaide, South Australia, Australia
 Curitiba, Paraná, Brazil
 Taiyuan, Shanxi, China
 Changwon, South Gyeongsang, South Korea

Japan
 Matsumoto, in Nagano Prefecture
 Tottori, capital city in Tottori Prefecture

Sister castle
 Château de Chantilly in Chantilly, France
 Conwy Castle (Castell Conwy) in North Wales, since October 2019

Local attractions
 Himeji Castle, a UNESCO World Heritage Site. For over 400 years, Himeji Castle has remained intact, even throughout the extensive bombing of Himeji in World War II and natural disasters such as the 1995 Great Hanshin earthquake and various typhoons.
 Engyō-ji temple
 Mount Seppiko
 Himeji Central Park (a safari park)
 Himeji City Tegarayama Botanical Garden
 Harima Kokubun-ji ruins, National Historic Site
 Koko-en Garden.
 Okishio Castle - A castle ruin, Home castle of the Akamatsu clan.

Notable people from Himeji
 (1546–1604), famed strategist under Toyotomi Hideyoshi
Mikinosuke Kawaishi (川石 酒造之助) (1899–1969), judoka
Aya Matsuura (松浦 亜弥) (1986-), entertainer
Psycho le Cému (サイコ・ル・シェイム), visual kei rock band
Kenzō Takada (高田 賢三) (1939-2020), fashion designer
Tetsuro Watsuji (和辻 哲郎) (1889-1960), philosopher and historian
Masahisa Takenaka (竹中 正久) (1933-1985), the 4th kumicho of Yamaguchi-gumi, Japan's largest Yakuza syndicate

References

External links

 Himeji City official website 
 Official tourism website 

Cities in Hyōgo Prefecture
Port settlements in Japan
Populated coastal places in Japan